Question 6 (colloquially called the Maryland same-sex marriage referendum) is a referendum that appeared on the general election ballot for the U.S. state of Maryland to allow voters to approve or reject the Civil Marriage Protection Act—a bill legalizing same-sex marriage passed by the General Assembly in 2012. The referendum was approved by 52.4% of voters on November 6, 2012 and thereafter went into effect on January 1, 2013.

Ballot measure
The ballot measure read as follows:

The choices read as follows:

History

The Civil Marriage Protection Act was passed by the Maryland General Assembly in February 2012 and signed on March 1, 2012, by Governor Martin O'Malley. The Maryland House of Delegates approved the bill by a 72–67 vote, and the Maryland Senate approved the bill by a vote of 25–22. Sections 2, 3 and 4 of the bill were included to ensure that religious leaders, religiously-controlled institutions, and their programs are legally protected from being required to officiate or provide facilities for a same-sex marriage or couple if they refuse.

Opponents of same-sex marriage announced the launch of the petition drive for the referendum two weeks later. "The General Assembly and the governor do not have the final word on marriage in Maryland," said Derek McCoy, executive director of Maryland Marriage Alliance. "The people do." Petitioners submitted more than twice the number of required signatures to place the referendum on the election ballot, and in June, the State Board of Elections announced that enough were validated.

Support and opposition

Support for Question 6 consisted of a coalition of civil rights leaders, clergy, businesses, partners, and politicians known as Marylanders for Marriage Equality. The opposition to Question 6 consisted of religious figures and politicians known as the Maryland Marriage Alliance.

Governor Martin O'Malley, a Catholic, led the 2012 campaign for same-sex marriage in Maryland. O'Malley said he concluded that "discriminating against individuals based on their sexual orientation in the context of civil marital rights is unjust" and "treating the children of families headed by same-sex couples with lesser protections under the law than the children of families headed by heterosexual parents, is also unjust."

Arguments supporting Question 6 included protecting the children of gay and lesbian couples by affording their parents equal rights under the law, improving quality of life, principles of fairness, civil equality, and highlighting religious protections. Arguments in opposition to Question 6 included protecting children from being taught same-sex marriage in public schools with a focus on "boys can marry boys", preserving parental rights, a traditional definition of marriage as between one man and one woman, and protecting religious beliefs. An official at Gallaudet University, Angela McCaskill, used as an example of religious persecution in a political ad opposing same-sex marriage, opted to have herself removed because it was misleading. McCaskill, who was fired after the university learned that she signed the petition in opposition of Question 6, said she signed solely "because she believed the matter should be voted on." Her personal views on same-sex marriage were unknown. Religious officials, as well as supporters of same-sex marriage rallied for McCaskill and called for her reinstatement, stating that she should not be penalized for her personal views. Several dozen small employers in the state have said that same-sex marriage will be good for business, helping to attract and retain talent.

Fundraising
Advocates for Question 6 raised a total of approximately $4.1 million: contributions from the organizations and individuals under Marylanders for Marriage Equality (78.5%), Human Rights Campaign's National Marriage Fund and Maryland Families PAC (14.2%), NAACP's National Voter Fund for Question 6 (5.8%), Freedom to Marry's Maryland PAC (0.9%), and Maryland for All Families (0.1%). Opponents of Question 6 raised a total of approximately $1.7 million: contributions from the organizations and individuals under Maryland Marriage Alliance, National Organization for Marriage (75%), and the Knights of Columbus (14.7%).

Notable Supporters 

Notable Opponents

Opinion polls

Public opinion surveys have reported those in favor of same-sex marriage and those opposed.

Results
On November 6, 2012, the measure was approved by 52.4% of voters. In a statement regarding the election results, Governor Martin O'Malley said "Whether your parents happen to be gay or straight, Democratic, Republican or Independent, your families are equal before the eyes of the law." The leading opposition group said that "No matter how it turns out, there have been thousands of people who are engaged in the process." On November 29, 2012, Attorney General Doug Gansler issued a legal opinion stating that court clerks could begin issuing marriage licenses to same-sex couples once the governor certified the election results on December 6, 2012, though they would not become effective until January 1, 2013. 21 out of the 24 counties in Maryland chose to issue the licenses ahead of schedule.

An exit poll conducted by AP and Edison Research found:

 7 in 10 young voters, age 29 and under, voted in favor of same-sex marriage.
 Almost 6 in 10 of those age 30 to 44 voted in favor of same-sex marriage.
 Nearly two-thirds of women with children voted in favor of same sex marriage.
 Those over age 45 slightly voted against same-sex marriage.
 Nearly two-thirds of those age 65 and older voted against same-sex marriage.

County breakdown

See also

 LGBT rights in Maryland
 Minnesota Amendment 1
 Same-sex marriage in the United States

Other same-sex marriage referendums
 Australian Marriage Law Postal Survey, 2017
 2016 Bermudian same-sex union and marriage referendum
 2013 Croatian constitutional referendum
 Irish same-sex marriage referendum, 2015
 2015 Slovak same-sex marriage referendum
 2015 Slovenian same-sex marriage referendum
 United States:
 Maine:
 2009 Maine same-sex marriage referendum
 2012 Maine same-sex marriage referendum
 2012 Washington same-sex marriage referendum

External links
 House Bill 438 – Civil Marriage Protection Act

References

LGBT rights in Maryland
LGBT law in the United States
2012 in LGBT history
Same-sex marriage ballot measures in the United States
Question 6
2012 ballot measures
Maryland ballot measures